Wild Cherry is a 2009 teen comedy film directed by Dana Lustig and starring Tania Raymonde, Rumer Willis, Kristin Cavallari, Ryan Merriman, Tia Carrere, and Rob Schneider.

Plot
Helen McNichol, a high school senior, decides to lose her virginity to Stanford Prescott, her jock boyfriend. However, she learns that her name is written in the high school football team's secret "Bang Book" and it is Stanford's job to deflower her. The tables are turned and the battle begins when she and her two best friends, Katelyn Chase and Trish Van Doren, form a pact to maintain their virginity, embarrass the team and foil the plot against them. Helen gets Stanford by ramming him off of a go-cart track and then she, along with Katelyn and Trish, trick him and his two best friends (who are also Katelyn's and Trish's boyfriends) into accidentally making out with each other.

At a party, they slip a sex pill into the punch, giving Stanford and his friends erections. Helen confronts Katelyn and Trish about the sex pills and blames them for everything. Visiting Stanford at the hospital, Helen tries to apologize and make it up to him, but he turns her down and tells her to go away. Heartbroken about her breakup with Stanford, Helen initially decides not to go his football game, but after a talk with her father Nathan about how people make mistakes in life, she changes her mind.

At the football game, Helen apologizes to Katelyn and Trish and they forgive her. Soon Stanford's team begins losing the game. During halftime, Helen takes the microphone and apologizes for everything and helps Stanford and his team into realizing why they are losing and Stanford forgives her. When the next match comes, Stanford and his team follow Helen's advice and defeat the other team. Everyone then goes to the victory party where Helen and Stanford finally have sex. Helen comes home after the party and sees Nathan sitting on a closed toilet playing a trombone through the window in which she smiles at.

Cast
 Tania Raymonde as Helen McNichol
 Rumer Willis as Katelyn Chase
 Kristin Cavallari as Trish Van Doren
 Tia Carrere as Ms. Haumea
 Rob Schneider as Nathan McNichol
 Elle King as Sabrina
 Ryan Merriman as Stanford Prescott
 Jesse Moss as Brad "Skeets" Skeetowski
 John White as Franklin Peters
 Tegan Moss as Hannah

Production
Film production took place in Winnipeg, Manitoba, from May 7 to May 29, 2008. School scenes were filmed at Technical Vocational High School.

References

External links
 
 
 
 Review at The New York Times

2009 films
2009 comedy films
2000s American films
2000s Canadian films
2000s English-language films
2000s high school films
American high school films
American teen comedy films
Canadian high school films
Canadian teen comedy films
English-language Canadian films
Films about virginity
Films directed by Dana Lustig
Films shot in Winnipeg